This page tracks the number of military conflicts with more than 1,000 fatalities, a categorization used by the Uppsala Conflict Data Program. It covers past years. For a list of ongoing conflicts, see: List of ongoing armed conflicts.

Number of conflicts per year

References

Citations

Notes